The Standart was an Imperial Russian yacht serving Emperor Nicholas II and his family, being in her time (late 19th/early 20th century) the largest Imperial Yacht afloat. After the Russian Revolution the ship was placed in drydock until 1936, when she was converted to a minelayer. During World War II, she participated in the defence of Leningrad.

History

Imperial Yacht

The Imperial Yacht Standart (Штандартъ) was built by order of Emperor Alexander III of Russia, and constructed at the Danish shipyard of Burmeister & Wain, beginning in 1893. She was launched on 21 March 1895 and came into service early September 1896.

Standart was fitted out with ornate fixtures, including mahogany paneling, crystal chandeliers, and other amenities that made the vessel a suitable floating palace for the Russian Imperial Family. The ship was crewed by sailors from the Russian Imperial Navy. During the reign of Nicholas II, Standart was commanded by a naval Captain, although the official commander was a Rear Admiral. Her commander in 1914 was Nikolai Pavlovich Sablin.

On 29 August 1907, Standart ran aground on an uncharted rock off the Finnish coast. Although damaged, the ship did not sink. She was refloated on 1 September with assistance from the icebreaker No. 1. Subsequently, repaired and returned to service. With the outbreak of World War I, Standart was placed in drydock.

In 1912, Emperors Nicholas II of Russia and Wilhelm II of Germany met on the yacht at Paldiski naval harbour for negotiations.

Soviet minelayer Marti

After the fall of the Romanov Dynasty, Standart was stripped down and pressed into naval service. The ship was renamed 18 marta (18 March), and later Marti (in honor of André Marty). In 1932–1936, Marti was converted into a minelayer by the Marti yard in Leningrad. During the Second World War, Marti served in the Baltic, laying mines and bombarding shore positions along the coast. On 23 September 1941, Marti was damaged in an air attack at Kronstadt, but later repaired and continued service until the end of the war. A mine laid off Hanko by Marti sunk the German submarine chaser UJ.117/Gustav Kroner on 1 October 1941.

After the war, Marti was converted into a training ship and renamed Oka in 1957. She continued serving in that role until she was scrapped at Tallinn, Estonia, in 1963.

Specifications

Displacement: 5557 tons
Length:  between perpendiculars
Length Overall: 
Width: 
Depth: 
Maximum Speed: 21.18 knots

Previous Imperial Yachts
 Alexandria (Александрия)
 Livadia
 Polyarnaya zvezda (Polar Star – Полярная звезда)

Notes

References 

 Conway's All the World's Fighting Ships 1922–1946

External links

 Russian Imperial Yacht Standart
 Royal Russia – Russian Imperial Yacht, the Standart

Royal and presidential yachts
Ships of the Imperial Russian Navy
1895 ships
Steam yachts
Mine warfare vessels of the Soviet Navy
Auxiliary ships of the Soviet Navy
Maritime incidents in 1907